Sinfronio "Sammy" Acaylar is a Filipino volleyball coach.

Career

Club
Acaylar has coached the Cignal HD Spikers women's team of the Philippine Super Liga helping them finish as runners-up twice in their first season in 2013.

He would join the Sta. Lucia Lady Realtors, who were newcomers in the 2017 season. He would guide the team in the All-Filipino Conference before resigning shortly prior to the start of the Grand Prix Conference due to commitments with other teams.

For the 2023 Spikers' Turf season, Acaylar is coaching the Imus City–AJAA Spikers.

Collegiate
Acaylar is known for his role in the University of Perpetual Help System DALTA Altas of the National Collegiate Athletic Association (NCAA). From 2010 to 2014, he would accomplish a win streak for the Altas men's team – which was then the longest in Philippine sport in general. He would return full time with Perpetual in 2018 after assuming multiple simultaneous coaching roles with other teams. He was also offered to become Perpetual's sports director in 2017.

He also coached the University of the East (UE) Red Warriors for their University Athletic Association of the Philippines (UAAP) Season 80 run in 2018.

National team
Acaylar has coached the Philippines men's national team in multiple occasions. He has coached the team which finished as bronze medalists at the 1991 Southeast Asian Games. He also led a team at the 2009 Asian Men's Volleyball Championship where they ended winless in six games.

Acaylar was once again tasked to lead the team in the 2017 Southeast Asian Games where they finished sixth.

He was also part of the coaching staff of the Philippines women's national team which won gold at the 1993 Southeast Asian Games.

References

Filipino volleyball coaches
Volleyball coaches of international teams
Living people
People from Cagayan de Oro